Harlan Albert Pyle (November 29, 1905 – January 13, 1993), nicknamed "Firpo", was a Major League Baseball pitcher. Pyle appeared in two games for the Cincinnati Reds during the 1928 season.

External links

1905 births
1993 deaths
Baseball players from Nebraska
People from Burchard, Nebraska
Major League Baseball pitchers
Cincinnati Reds players
Peoria Tractors players
McCook Generals players